Myoclonic epilepsy refers to a family of epilepsies that present with myoclonus. It starts in both sides of the body at once, and last for more than a second or two. When myoclonic jerks are occasionally associated with abnormal brain wave activity, it can be categorized as myoclonic seizure. If the abnormal brain wave activity is persistent and results from ongoing seizures, then a diagnosis of myoclonic epilepsy may be considered. Myoclonic seizures frequently occur in day-to-day life. During sleep, abrupt jerks and hiccups occurred.

Myoclonic jerks are typical without regularity. Myoclonus can be a source of substantial disability with impairment in daily activities. Myoclonus can be termed positive or negative, A sudden muscle contraction is known as "positive myoclonus," and a brief loss of muscular tone is known as "negative myoclonus". Myoclonus which occurred at rest indicates the source as a spinal or brainstem. Myoclonus which is action induced indicates the source as cortical. Focal and multifocal jerk which happened during voluntary action is an example of typical cortical myoclonus. Myoclonic seizures mostly can bee seen in people with generalized or genetic epilepsy. Because of its quick occurrence Myoclonic epilepsy some times can not be observed. Sometimes it is mistaken as tics or clumsiness. Myoclonic epilepsy of infancy is an infrequent disorder. 1% to 2% of childhood epilepsy are affected by myoclonic epilepsy of infancy. MEI happens frequently in the age group of 6 months to 2 years.

Signs and symptoms

Myoclonus can be described as brief jerks of the body;  it can involve any part of the body, but it is mostly seen in limbs or facial muscles. The jerks are usually involuntary and can lead to falls. EEG is used to read brain wave activity. Spike activity produced from the brain is usually correlated with brief jerks seen on EMG or excessive muscle artifact. They usually occur without detectable loss of consciousness and may be generalized, regional or focal on the EEG tracing. Myoclonus jerks can be epileptic or not epileptic. Epileptic myoclonus is an elementary electroclinical manifestation of epilepsy involving descending neurons, whose spatial (spread) or temporal (self-sustained repetition) amplification can trigger overt epileptic activity.

The probable symptoms of myoclonic epilepsy are:

Brief Moment-They last for a very brief moment. During epilepsy, muscle contractions caused tighten up of muscles, which lasts for fraction of a second.
Small Groups of Muscles-They usually happen to small groups of muscles, including muscles of arms, legs, and face.
Limited Numbers-They happen in limited numbers. A myoclonic seizure usually happened once, but sometimes more than once.
Certain Circumstances: They’re more likely under certain circumstances, like early morning when a person wakes up, in a very tired and sleepy state, stressed and anxious, or after alcohol consumption.
Usual Awareness: People are usually aware of epilepsy loss of consciousness or awareness doesn’t happen with myoclonic seizures like other seizures.

Causes
The exact cause of myoclonic epilepsy is unknown. Some conditions or circumstances that leads to myoclonic epilepsy can be as follows:
Brain tumor
Brain infection (meningitis or encephalitis)
Reduced oxygen to the brain
Cerebral hypoxia (lack of oxygen).
Severe concussion
traumatic brain injury
Degenerative brain diseases like Alzheimer’s disease or frontotemporal dementia.
Drugs and alcohol abuse
Drug or alcohol withdrawal
Infections like encephalitis or meningitis
Metabolic problems, like hyperglycemia or hypoglycemia
Toxic levels of metals like lithium

Diagnosis
Myoclonic seizures can be diagnosed mainly by a test called an electroencephalogram (EEG) or video-EEG. The other process that can help to diagnose Myoclonic seizures are Blood tests, CT Scans, MRI Scans, and lumbar punctures.

There are two syndromes and several related disorders.

Juvenile 
Juvenile myoclonic epilepsy is responsible for 7% of cases of epilepsy. Seizures usually begin around puberty and usually have a genetic basis. Seizures can be stimulus-selective, with flashing lights being one of the most common triggers. The occurrence of seizure in JME is mostly in the morning after waking up. The characteristics of JME are, myoclonic jerks, generalized tonic-clonic seizures, and sometimes, absence seizures. JME is a known genetic disorder. Most common cause of JME is mutation of CACNB4, GABRA1 gene.

Symptoms:
Generalized-onset seizure
Morning myoclonic jerks
Abnormality of eye movement
Abnormality of the mouth
Photosensitive tonic-clonic seizure
Aggressive behavior
Intellectual disability
Status epilepticus

Progressive 
Progressive myoclonus epilepsy is a disease associated with myoclonus, epileptic seizures, and other problems with walking or speaking. These symptoms often worsen over time and can be fatal. The onset of PME is infancy, childhood, juvenile or adult, but it present in late childhood or adolescence. PMEs have very poor resistance to treatment and prognosis is also poor. PME characterized by myoclonus, generalized epilepsy, and neurological symptoms, such as dementia and ataxia.

MERRF syndrome is also known as myoclonic epilepsy with ragged-red fibers. This rare inherited disorder affects muscles cells. Features of MERRF, along with myoclonus epilepsy seizures, include ataxia, peripheral neuropathy, and dementia. MERRF is a rare disorder; the prevalence of this disorder is unknown. MERRF falls under the mitochondrial disorders group. The estimated affected people are 1 in 5,000 people worldwide. Most common cause of MERRF is nutation of MT-TK gene. These mutations affect the brain and muscles. The onset of this syndrome is childhood, and adolescence.

Symptoms:

Sudden, jerking muscle spasms
ataxia
muscle weakness 
Decreased body height 
hearing loss
deterioration of intellectual function 
altered sensation

Lafora disease is also known as Lafora progressive myoclonus epilepsy, which is an autosomal recessive inherited disorder involving recurrent seizures and degradation of mental capabilities. Lafora disease usually occurs in late childhood and usually leads to death around 10 years after first signs of the disease. It is characterized by recurrent seizures (epilepsy) and a decline in intellectual function. The onset of Lafora progressive myoclonus epilepsy is late childhood or adolescence, but it is worsened with time. It is mostly affecting the Mediterranean countries (Spain, Italy, France), Northern Africa, the Middle East, and in some regions of Southern India. One of the reasons for the particular region being affected more because of the high rate of consanguinity. The prevalence of Lafora progressive myoclonus epilepsy is unknown. Most common cause of Lafora progressive myoclonus epilepsy is nutation of EPM2A gene.

Symptoms
worsening of cognition
visual loss
Loss of coordination
significant motor decline
difficulty with brushing teeth and brushing hair
shortened life span
Difficulty bringing utensils to the mouth 

Unverricht-Lundborg disease is an autosomal recessive inherited disorder seen in individuals as young as six years. It is associated with possible loss of consciousness, rigidity, ataxia, dysarthria, declination of mental functioning, and involuntary shaking. As disease progressed emotional sensitivity, depression, and a mild impairment of intellectual performance also developed. Worldwide prevalence is unknown. This disease occurs most frequently in found in the Scandinavian country. The prevalence is approximately 4 in 100,000. Most common cause of Unverricht-Lundborg disease is nutation of EPM2A gene. The prognosis and mortality rate is unknown due to a scarcity of data.

Neuronal ceroid lipofuscinosis is a group of diseases that cause blindness, loss of mental abilities, and loss of movement. All diseases in this group are lysosomal-storage disorders that also lead to death roughly ten years after onset of the disease.

Related disorders
Lennox–Gastaut syndrome is often associated with intellectual deficits as well as a lack of response to anti-epileptic drugs. It usually begins in the first years of life.

Reticular reflex myoclonus is a generalized form of epilepsy originating from the brain stem. Jerks associated with the disorder can affect all muscles on the body or be selective in certain areas. Jerks can be triggered by voluntary movement or be stimulus-selective.

Differential diagnosis 
Myoclonic jerks that are not epileptic may be due to a nervous system disorder or other metabolic abnormalities that may arise in renal (e.g. hyperuraemia) and liver failure (e.g. high ammonia states).

Treatment
As Myoclonic seizures are so short-lived, so rescue medicine can help to prevent Myoclonic seizures. Ativan®, Valium®, clonazepam, clobazam, etc are a few examples of rescue medications. Apart from medication, there are a few other forms of treatment, such as Epilepsy surgery, ketogenic diets, vagal nerve stimulation, or deep brain stimulation.

References

External links 

Epilepsy types